SS Ancon was an American cargo and passenger ship that became the first ship to officially transit the Panama Canal in 1914 although the French crane boat Alexandre La Valley completed the first trip in stages during construction prior to the official opening. The ship was built as Shawmut for the Boston Steamship Company by the Maryland Steel Company, Sparrows Point, Maryland and put into Pacific service operating out of Puget Sound ports for Japan, China and the Philippine Islands. Shawmut and sister ship Tremont were two of the largest United States commercial ships in service at the time and the company eventually found them too expensive to operate.

Shawmut and Tremont were acquired by the United States Government through the agency of the Panama Railroad Company's Panama Railroad Steamship Line, whose assets were entirely owned by the government and critical to construction of the canal, to serve between New York and the Atlantic terminus during canal construction. Though not the first vessel to make a complete transit, Ancon made the first official and ceremonial transit with a delegation of some two hundred dignitaries aboard. After the end of World War I the ship saw very brief service from  28 March to 25 July 1919 as a commissioned United States Ship, USS Ancon (ID-1467), making two round trip voyages from the New York Port of Embarkation to France returning troops home. Ancon was returned to Panama Canal service and was in service with the canal until 1939 when the ship was sold to private parties known as the Permanente Steamship Company and renamed Permanente.

Construction and design 
The steamer was constructed by Maryland Steel, Sparrows Point, Maryland, for the Boston Steamship Line as the SS Shawmut launched December 1901 and completed in 1902. The launch date is given as "today" in a piece in The New York Times datelined December 21, 1901, and published on 22 December while the journal Marine Engineering gives the date as 23 December.

Commercial service 
Shawmut was put into service by the Boston Steamship Company in association with the Northern Pacific and Great Northern Railways acting as booking agents with monthly passenger and freight sailings from Puget Sound ports of Tacoma and Seattle, Washington and Victoria, British Columbia to Yokohama, Kobe and Moji, Japan; Shanghai and Hong Kong, China and Manila, Philippines.

Shawmut's maiden voyage led to questions about whether such large ships could be profitable with specific questions concerning even larger ships being built by James J. Hill for trans Pacific trade. The ship had arrived in Seattle to begin loading for the voyage on 22 July 1902 sailing for Tacoma on 25 July to load cargo, largely of lumber that had to be transshipped due to the fact the ship was too large to enter the lumber port, and took until 22 August to fully load cargo from scattered origins. She sailed on 22 August with a stop at Seattle before proceeding to sea that night and reached Yokohama 12 September unloading a small consignment. The lumber was destined for Shanghai, but the ship was too large to reach the docks on arrival 20 September and had to unload by lighter taking until 13 October before departure for Hong Kong. On reaching Hong Kong 18 October where there was little cargo to load and only a small amount to carry on to Manila upon departure 8 November. By 22 November Shawmut was in Yokohama for a final stop before departure for Seattle on 23 November where she arrived 8 December, 139 days for the voyage. The ship had carried a then record breaking 13,000 tons of cargo, but returned with only about 2,500 tons and an estimated deficit of over $21,000 for the trip. There was speculation that Hill had used a Boston company to "experiment" on using large ships for the trade before committing his vessels.

The ship had arrived in Yokohama early in the Russo-Japanese War reporting Japanese torpedo boats hundreds of miles at sea investigating all ships. She departed Yokohama with Jewish businessmen from the Russian port of Vladivostok who had been suddenly ordered out by Russian authorities and escaped through Korea where Japanese authorities had detained them before bringing them to Yokohama where they boarded Shawmut which had reached Seattle in late March. The ship was also under close surveillance by Japanese "special service agents" who even kept a guard at one passenger's door. Among the passengers bound for Seattle were 235 Filipinos on the way to the St. Louis World's Fair along with material for the Filipino and Japanese villages at the fair. Shawmut sailed for Japan again on 16 July 1904 with 15,000 tons of cargo that included 900,000 pounds of canned beef destined for Kobe, Japan and was at sea when a cable from London instructed marine insurance agents to not accept risks on ships or cargoes for Japan for fear of seizure by belligerents.

Shawmut had grounded off the coast of China in the fall of 1904 due to weather suffering loss of her rudder, propellers and suffering a double fracture to her stern frame and "spectacle" supports for her propellers but, after repair in an overseas dry dock, managed a return to home waters and one round trip before making permanent repairs. The replacement stern frame and propeller supports were built by the ship's original builder and sent to Seattle to meet the ship there in January 1905 for the permanent repair. Moran Brothers' Company of Seattle proposed to do the repairs using the only dry dock of sufficient size, the naval dry dock at Bremerton, but the Navy's charges were "exorbitant" and Moran devised a means of using their small floating dry dock to do the repairs by only lifting the stern of Shawmut using a cofferdam to seal and de-water the work space.

By 1907 predictions of economic trouble had become fact with Shawmut and Tremont withdrawn from Pacific service and replaced in the Philippine trade by the British firm of Andrew Weir and Company. The consequence, in the words of His Majesty's consul in Manila in his report for 1907, was that "the American flag disappears from the Pacific trade with the single exception of the Northern Pacific Steamship Company's passenger-freighter Minnesota." By October 1908 the annual meeting of the Boston Steamship Company was reported to be postponed pending news of the sale of both Shawmut and Tremont because the company stated they could not be operated without a subsidy.

The Panama Canal service 
In 1909 the ship was purchased by the Panama Canal. The ship was renamed for the Panama Canal's Pacific side terminus at Ancon. Both Ancon and her sister ship Cristobal operated under The Panama Railroad Company's Panama Railroad Steamship Line. Both ships played a crucial role in building the canal, bringing workers and supplies, notably massive amounts of cement, from New York to Panama for the construction project.

On 15 August 1914 Ancon made the first official transit of the canal as part of the canal's opening ceremonies. (Her sister ship Cristobal had made the first unofficial transit on 3 August, delivering a load of cement, while an old French crane boat Alexandre La Valley had crossed the canal from the Atlantic in stages during construction, finally reaching the Pacific on 7 January.)

Five days after the end of World War I, on 16 November 1918, Ancon was acquired at New Orleans by the United States Navy from the Department of War (Army) and commissioned on 28 March 1919 under the command of Lt. Comdr. Milan L. Pittman, USNRF as the troop transport USS Ancon (ID-1467). The ship was assigned to the Atlantic Fleet's Cruiser and Transport Force making two round-trip voyages from the United States to France returning troops home. On completion of the second voyage Ancon was decommissioned at New York City on 25 July 1919 and returned to the War Department.

The Panama Railroad Company replaced SS Ancon in 1938 with a larger steam turbine cargo liner named Ancon which later saw considerable action as the Navy command and communications ship  in World War II. The old Ancon remained in Panama Canal service as Ex Ancon until sold privately.

Further service 
In 1941, the ship was sold to the Permanente Steam Ship Company in Oakland, California and renamed Permanente. After the end of World War II, the vessel changed hands to the Tidewater Commercial Company in Panama who renamed it Tidewater in 1946, and again to Continental in 1948. Two years later, the Bernstein Line in Panama acquired the ship and renamed her back to Ancon before sending her to Italian shipbreakers, arriving on 26 October 1950. The Ancon was finally scrapped by the Trosidea Ricuperi Metallici company in Savona.

See also

Panama Canal Zone
Panama Canal Railway
Panama Canal

Footnotes

References

Bibliography

Ships built in Sparrows Point, Maryland
Transports of the United States Navy
World War I auxiliary ships of the United States
1901 ships
Panama Canal
History of Panama
Steamships of the United States
Merchant ships of the United States
Cargo liners
Water transport in Panama